Fiona Elizabeth Fraser (born 6 September 1980) is a New Zealand former cricketer who played as a right-handed batter and right-arm medium bowler. She appeared in 5 One Day Internationals for New Zealand in 2002. She played domestic cricket for Canterbury and Wellington.

Fraser joined the New Zealand Cricket Academy in 2001. She was selected for the New Zealand's tour of India in 2001, but the tour was later cancelled.

References

External links

1980 births
Living people
Cricketers from Wellington City
New Zealand women cricketers
New Zealand women One Day International cricketers
Canterbury Magicians cricketers
Wellington Blaze cricketers